Art Deco is a visual arts and architectural style popularized in the 1920s.

Art Deco may also refer to:
 Art Deco (album), a 1988 album by Don Cherry
 "Art Deco", a song from the Lana Del Rey album ''Honeymoon

See also
 
 Art Nouveau, an art style preceding Art Deco